Ielja Strik (born 25 March 1973 in Cuijk) is a Dutch powerlifter and a former gymnast and bodybuilder.

Biography
Strik started gymnastics when she was five years old and practiced this for around 15 years, attaining a reasonably high domestic level. After her build changed she decided that perhaps fitness suited her better as a sport, quickly changing to bodybuilding. After a number of successes Strik started powerlifting in 2001. Quickly it turned out she possessed quite some strength and after a month of practicing the sport she entered the Dutch championships. Strik was immediately asked to join the Dutch selection.

Strik has a personal preference for bench press and competes in this sport next to her powerlift competitions. In 2006, she broke the world record bench press, attaining a result of 182,5 kg. On 14 March 2010 she improved on her world record by half a kilogram to clear 183 kg. From 2004 up to and including 2007 she was both European and World record holder in bench pressing.

In powerlifting she attained the world record in both 2006 and 2007 with 3 gold medals each. Strik competes in the class up to 90 kg. The world record bench press for women above 90 kg was improved in 2010 by the Russian Irina Lugovaya, who pushed 205 kg, unheard of for a woman before then. At these same championships the Dutch Joanne Schaefer attained a short-lived world record of 202.5 kg. For competitors up to 90 kg, Strik still holds the world record with her result of 183 kg.

She represented the Netherlands at the 2022 World Games held in Birmingham, United States.

Through the years Strik had many trainers and coaches of whom she's very grateful, by her own account.

Ten selected results

 *=Dutch record.

References

External links/sources
 
 Wimwam.nl/women

1973 births
Living people
Dutch female bodybuilders
Dutch powerlifters
Female powerlifters
World Games silver medalists
Competitors at the 2005 World Games
Competitors at the 2009 World Games
Competitors at the 2013 World Games
Competitors at the 2017 World Games
Competitors at the 2022 World Games
20th-century Dutch women
21st-century Dutch women